J. Birney Crum Stadium is a multi-purpose stadium in Allentown, Pennsylvania. It is the largest high school stadium in Pennsylvania and the 14th largest in the nation with a capacity of 15,000. The stadium serves as the home football field for each of Allentown's three high schools: William Allen High School, Louis E. Dieruff High School, and Allentown Central Catholic High School, each of which compete in the Eastern Pennsylvania Conference, one of the premiere high school athletic conferences in the nation.

History

The stadium opened in 1948 as Allentown High School Stadium. It was alternately referred to as Allentown School District Stadium and ASD Stadium until being renamed in 1982 in honor of J. Birney Crum, a football, basketball, and baseball coach at Allentown High School (present-day William Allen High School), who was inducted into the Pennsylvania Sports Hall of Fame in 1974. The stadium was renovated in 2002 and FieldTurf was installed to replace the original natural grass surface.

The stadium is also the home high school playing field for numerous Eastern Pennsylvania Conference football players who went on to careers in the NFL, including Ed McCaffrey of the Denver Broncos and New York Giants, Andre Reed of the Buffalo Bills and Washington Redskins, Tony Stewart of the Philadelphia Eagles, Cincinnati Bengals and Oakland Raiders, and others.

The stadium hosts a large Fourth of July fireworks display that typically draws tens of thousands of spectators.

Crum is a marching arts performance venue. The stadium hosts the annual Drum Corps International Eastern Classic. Formerly the DCI East Championships, this event hosts all of DCI's World Class Drum and Bugle Corps the weekend before its world championships, which are held in Indianapolis. The stadium hosts the Collegiate Marching Band Festival, held in late September or early October and showcases college and university marching bands of all sizes and styles from across the Mid-Atlantic and Northeastern United States. Crum also is the site of the USBands A Class National Championships, featuring performances of high school marching bands each November.

The stadium is owned by the Allentown School District.

References

External links

"Six things you might not know about J. Birney Stadium" video

1948 establishments in Pennsylvania
American football venues in Pennsylvania
Defunct National Premier Soccer League stadiums
High school football venues in the United States
Multi-purpose stadiums in the United States
Soccer venues in Pennsylvania
Sports venues completed in 1948
Sports venues in Allentown, Pennsylvania